Boy & Girl Band Indonesia is a music show aired on SCTV. The music show will first aired on December 10, 2011. In 2011, audition are in Jakarta, Bandung, Yogyakarta, Surabaya and Medan.

Season 1

Judges
 Kevin Aprilio
 Maia Estianty
 Dewi Sandra
 Melly Goeslaw
 Uya Kuya

References

External links
Official website

Indonesian television series